Yesterday's Bride is a Philippine television drama series broadcast by GMA Network. Directed by Gil Tejada Jr., it stars Lovi Poe in the title role. It premiered on October 29, 2012 on the network's Afternoon Prime line up replacing Hindi Ka na Mag-iisa. The series concluded on February 22, 2013 with a total of 85 episodes. It was replaced by Unforgettable in its timeslot.

Cast and characters

Lead cast
 Lovi Poe as Andrea Manalo / Lorraine Agustin
Works in a furniture shop owned by the Ramirezes, the simple, uneducated but kind-hearted, Andrea falls in love with her boss's son, Justin Ramirez. Despite their diverse social backgrounds and the obvious opposition of the latter's parents, the young lovers are determined to fight for their love and happiness. On her way to her wedding with Justin, an accident strikes which renders her into a coma. Andrea is found pregnant. The more that Justin shows his care, love and attention for her. Another twist of fate comes to a worse when fire breaks out in the hospital. Miraculously, Andrea wakes up and finds herself in a mansion not knowing who the owner is, and even forgetting her name and her past.

Supporting cast
 Rocco Nacino as Justin Ramirez
Born from a prominent family, Justin is the sheltered heir of the Ramirezes. He falls deeply in love with their lowly worker, Andrea Manalo, much to his mother's dismay. Out of extreme love, he braves all the obstacles just to be with the woman he loves.  Tragedy strikes and fate takes a sudden twist and destroy their dreams of having a simple and happy family life together.
 Luis Alandy as Dr. Celso Agustin
A respectable and kind-hearted doctor who saves and takes good care of Andrea Manalo during her "loss" times and even giving her a name, Loraine. Soon, Celso and Loraine/Andrea find themselves falling in love with each other. But things get complicated as the latter starts to regain her memory and unravel the mystery of her past.
 Karel Marquez as Dr. Sabrina Torres
The doctor who delivered Andrea's baby. She is a bipolar woman who loves Justin Ramirez to a passion. She will do anything to lure the latter into her trap and determined to take down anyone who dares to get in her way.
 Ara Mina as Josilda Ramirez
Justin's ambitious and arrogant mother and the owner of the huge furniture shop where Andrea works. She will do everything to keep her precious son away from Andrea, even if it means making life hell for Andrea in the most evil way imaginable.
 Emilio Garcia as Pete Ramirez
The spouse of Josie and the strict father of Justin and Joel. Self-centered and over-domineering, Pete seeks to control everything and everyone.
 Mark Bautista as Dave Serrano
Celso Agustin's close friend and confidante. He also works as a doctor. He proves himself a true friend as he constantly stands by Celso's side through all the latter’s ordeals.
 Raquel Villavicencio as Conchita Agustin
The mother of Dr. Celso Agustin. She hates Loraine/Andrea for her son and will do whatever it takes to tear them apart.
 Nina Ricci Alagao as Suzanne Torres
A strong-willed and cunning woman who will do whatever it takes just to protect her daughter from further pain and disappointments in life.
 Lou Sison as Fey
The personal nurse-turned-close friend of Loraine/Andrea.
 Ken Chan as Joel Ramirez
The younger brother and somewhat a friend and confidant of Justin Ramirez.

Production and development
Series' creator, Liberty Trinidad began developing Yesterday's Bride under the title "The Borrowed Wife" in July 2012. The idea for the series was conceive when Trinidad began thinking... "What if a mother gives birth to her child while in deep coma?". The production team found the concept/premise very interesting. Trinidad stated that the series also presents an interesting take to a seemingly perfect love story, as it explores the moral dilemma of the protagonist and how she must decide between the two men who love her. "The show is very current and viewers will be able to relate to Andrea's [the main character of the story] predicament because even though their situation may be different, everyone has to make tough decisions especially when it comes to love," she added. Show's program manager, Hazel Abonita described the story as "intimate". It's about the actors and their characters and how they will engage viewers in the storytelling. It doesn't have added factors like special effects to hook the public," she added.

Casting
Lovi Poe played the titular character, Andrea Manalo. Poe described her role "the most quiet role I have ever played" and far different from the strong-willed and independent characters she did in television series, Legacy and movies, Temptation Island and My Neighbor's Wife. Here, the female lead is subject to oppression and much emotional torment. It is the goody-goody type [that of the usual screen heroine]. "It looks easy but it is a lot harder for me. I am used to playing independent and strong women. This time around, it is more about falling in love and becoming martyr. It is something new to me," she said. By far "It's challenging because there will be adjustments in my attack. Coming from strong female characters, it’s not that easy to create nuances for your new role. But this is where the excitement lies. It will definitely test your range as an actress," she added. Rocco Nacino cast as Justin Ramirez, one of the two leading men of the protagonist. Nacino stated that it's his "first mature role". Nacino and Poe first worked together in 2010 mini-series Mistaken Identity. Luis Alandy and Karel Marquez, on the other hand, played Celso Ramirez, the other love interest and Sabrina Torres, the series' main antagonist, respectively.

Filming
The series' plug, teasers, as well as the opening title sequence were filmed in a studio at GMA Network Center, in Quezon City. Production started filming the series on October 12, 2012. Many of the series' scenes were shot on location in Angeles, Pampanga.

Ratings
According to AGB Nielsen Philippines' Nationwide Urban Television Audience Measurement overnight ratings, the pilot episode of Yesterday's Bride earned a 14.8% rating. While the final episode scored a 21.8% rating in Mega Manila household television ratings.

Accolades

References

External links
 

2012 Philippine television series debuts
2013 Philippine television series endings
Filipino-language television shows
GMA Network drama series
Television shows set in the Philippines